Players and pairs who neither have high enough rankings nor receive wild cards may participate in a qualifying tournament held one week before the annual Wimbledon Tennis Championships.

Qualifiers

  Louise Field /  Eva Krapl
  Alexia Dechaume /  Emmanuelle Derly
  Jo-Anne Faull /  Rachel McQuillan
  Yukie Koizumi /  Kim Steinmetz

Lucky losers

  Ann Grossman /  Masako Yanagi
  Lisa O'Neill /  Jill Smoller

Qualifying draw

First qualifier

Second qualifier

Third qualifier

Fourth qualifier

External links

1988 Wimbledon Championships – Women's draws and results at the International Tennis Federation

Women's Doubles Qualifying
Wimbledon Championship by year – Women's doubles qualifying
Wimbledon Championships